Philip Charles Habib (February 25, 1920 – May 25, 1992) was an American career diplomat active from 1949 to 1987. 

During his 30-year career as a Foreign Service Officer, he had mostly specialized in Asia. In 1968, he was working to prevent the escalation of U.S. involvement in Vietnam. 

Habib later became known for his work as Ronald Reagan's special envoy to the Middle East from 1981 to 1983. In that role, he negotiated numerous cease-fire agreements between the various parties involved in the Lebanese Civil War. 

He came out of retirement to take two assignments as U.S. special envoy; one to the Philippines in 1986, and another to Central America in 1986–87. In the latter assignment, he helped Costa Rican president Oscar Arias propose a peace plan to end the region's civil wars.  

Habib was awarded the Presidential Medal of Freedom in 1982—the highest official honor given to a U.S. citizen by the U.S. government.

Early life and education
Born in Brooklyn, New York, Habib was the son of Lebanese Maronite Catholic parents and was raised in a predominantly Jewish neighborhood of the Bensonhurst section . His father ran a grocery store. Habib graduated from New Utrecht High School in Brooklyn and worked as a shipping clerk before starting his undergraduate study in forestry at the University of Idaho. Habib remained connected to the University of Idaho throughout his life. He co-chaired the university's centennial fund-raising campaign several years earlier, as well as several class reunions. 

After graduating in 1942 from the UI's College of Forestry (now Natural Resources), he served in the U.S. Army during World War II and attained the rank of captain. Discharged from the service in 1946, Habib continued his education via the G.I. Bill in a doctoral program in agricultural economics at the University of California in Berkeley, and earned a Ph.D. in 1952.

In 1947, recruiters for the United States Foreign Service visited the Berkeley campus. They were particularly interested in candidates who did not fit the then-current mold of Ivy League blueblood WASPs. Habib says he had never given diplomacy a moment's thought, and that he just enjoyed taking tests for intellectual challenge. He took the Foreign Service exam and scored in the top 10% nationally.

Foreign service career

Beginning in 1949, his foreign service career took him to Canada, New Zealand, South Korea (twice), and South Vietnam. He held the position of Deputy Assistant Secretary of State for East Asian and Pacific Affairs from 1967–1969 and was chief of staff for the U.S. delegation to the Paris Peace Talks from 1968 to 1971. Habib acquired increasingly important posts, serving as Ambassador to South Korea (1971–1974), Assistant Secretary of State for East Asian and Pacific Affairs (1974–1976), and Under Secretary of State for Political Affairs (1976–1978). 

When South Korean opposition leader Kim Dae-jung was kidnapped in 1973 while Habib was U.S. ambassador to South Korea, Habib credits his intervention for saving Kim's life. Kim later became the first opposition leader in South Korea to become president and also won the Nobel Peace Prize in 2000 for his reconciliation efforts with North Korea.

Habib served as Acting Secretary of State in January 1977. 

In 1978, a massive heart attack forced Habib to resign as Under Secretary, the top post possible for a career Foreign Service Officer. In 1981, President Ronald Reagan called him out of retirement to serve as special envoy to the Middle East. Habib oversaw the negotiations of a peace deal that allowed the PLO to evacuate from the besieged city of Beirut. In 1982, for his efforts he was awarded the Presidential Medal of Freedom—the highest official honor given to a U.S. citizen by the U.S. government.

Early in 1986, Reagan sent Habib to the Philippines to convince President Ferdinand Marcos to step down. In March 1986, Reagan appointed him as a special envoy to Central America with the intention of furthering U.S. interests in the conflict in Nicaragua. Administration hard-liners intended to use his fame and stature to advance a military solution, namely further funding of the Contras.

Deciding that the Contadora Plan had run its course, Óscar Arias, the newly elected president of Costa Rica, drew up a plan that focused on democratization. While he viewed the Arias plan as riddled with loopholes, Habib worked to help revise it, and promoted it to other Central American governments. 

On August 7, 1987, the five Central American presidents, much to the shock of the rest of the world, agreed in principle to the Arias plan. Because further negotiating would require Habib to meet directly with Nicaragua's president, Daniel Ortega, President Reagan forbade him to travel. Believing he no longer had the confidence of the president, Habib resigned.

Death and legacy

While on vacation in France in 1992, Habib suffered a cardiac arrhythmia in Puligny-Montrachet and died on May 25 at age 72.

Former Secretary of State George Shultz spoke at his funeral in Belmont, California, and characterized Habib as "...a man who really made a difference." He was buried nearby at the Golden Gate National Cemetery in San Bruno, just south of San Francisco. Speakers at his memorial service in Washington at the National Cathedral the following week included two former Secretaries of State, Henry Kissinger and Cyrus Vance, and a future one, former colleague Lawrence Eagleburger.

In 2006, Habib was featured on a United States postage stamp, one of a block of six featuring prominent diplomats. In 2013, the city of Junieh, Lebanon, unveiled a bust of Habib among other "national heroes" in Friendship Square.

Habib is the subject of the 1982 Warren Zevon song "The Envoy".

References

External links

 U.S. Department of State – Philip Habib
 
 One Brief Miracle: The Diplomat, the Zealot, and the Wild Blundering Siege
 Association for Diplomatic Studies and Training – Philip Habib
 University of Idaho Alumni Hall of Fame (1969)
 University of Idaho – Distinguished Idahoan (1983) – Philip Habib
 
 

1920 births
1992 deaths
Ambassadors of the United States to South Korea
American people of Lebanese descent
Assistant Secretaries of State for East Asian and Pacific Affairs
Burials at Golden Gate National Cemetery
New Utrecht High School alumni
People from Belmont, California
People from Bensonhurst, Brooklyn
Presidential Medal of Freedom recipients
University of California, Berkeley alumni
University of Idaho alumni
University of Michigan faculty
Under Secretaries of State for Political Affairs
United States Foreign Service personnel
Recipients of the President's Award for Distinguished Federal Civilian Service
Acting United States Secretaries of State
United States Army personnel of World War II
American expatriates in Canada
American expatriates in New Zealand
American expatriates in Vietnam
American expatriates in France
American expatriates in Lebanon